"Meet Me at Our Spot" is a song by American duo the Anxiety, consisting of American singers Willow Smith and Tyler Cole. It was initially released through MSFTSMusic and Roc Nation on March 13, 2020, from the band's self-titled debut album. On October 5, 2021, the song was released as a single to contemporary hit radio.

Background
Though the song did not chart at the time of its 2020 release, it became a sleeper hit in 2021 after becoming popular on TikTok, with users incorporating it as the soundtrack to their summer, or playing it in the background of cartoon videos.

Kelsey Garcia of Popsugar felt the song "is a sludgy alternative track with emo undertones that hits at the zeitgeist and is pretty inescapable on TikTok."

Chart performance
After it became a viral hit on TikTok, the song entered various charts, reaching No. 21 on the US Billboard Hot 100, becoming Willow's highest-charting entry since "Whip My Hair" (2010), as well as her second top-40 hit on the chart. It also reached the top 10 in Australia, Ireland, New Zealand and UK.

Charts

Weekly charts

Year-end charts

Certifications

Release history

References

2020 songs
2021 singles
Willow Smith songs
Songs written by Willow Smith
American alternative rock songs
Roc Nation singles